Myrcia fasciata is a species of plant in the family Myrtaceae. It is endemic to Ecuador.

References

Endemic flora of Ecuador
fasciata
Endangered plants
Taxonomy articles created by Polbot